Rubén Rivera Moreno (born November 14, 1973) is a Panamanian former professional baseball player. His cousin, Mariano Rivera, was the former long-time closer for the New York Yankees. With the Yankees, he won the 1996 World Series over the Atlanta Braves.

Career

New York Yankees (1990–1997)
He made his professional debut with the Gulf Coast Yankees in 1992 and his major league debut with the Yankees on September 3, 1995. Rivera was highly touted as a prospect, being ranked as high as second overall amongst prospects by Baseball America in 1995, third in 1996, and ninth in 1997.

He played in 46 games for the 1996 New York Yankees. He was added to the postseason roster, and appeared in the 1996 American League Division Series.

San Diego Padres (1997–2000)
On April 22, he was traded with pitcher Rafael Medina and US $3 million to the San Diego Padres for infielder Homer Bush and minor leaguer Gordon Amerson and two players to be named later, who turned out to be the highly anticipated Japanese pitcher Hideki Irabu and minor leaguer Vernon Maxwell. He was released shortly before the 2001 season.

Cincinnati Reds, Texas Rangers & San Francisco Giants (2001–2006)
The Cincinnati Reds signed Rivera for the 2001 season, but he did not perform any better for the Reds in a reserve role than he did the Padres. They waived him after the season, and the San Francisco Giants picked him up, but released him a month later without his having played a game for them.

After this became known, his teammates allegedly voted him off the team, and the Yankees released him. When the incident became public, Rivera apologized but criticized the team after being removed.

He signed a minor league contract with the Texas Rangers on March 31, 2002 and was assigned to the Tulsa Drillers. He performed poorly for them in a reserve role and was released immediately following the season.

In 2003, Rivera re-joined the Giants as a free agent. He was involved in an infamous baserunning gaffe in a 13-inning 4–3 win over the Arizona Diamondbacks at Pacific Bell Park on May 27. Representing the potential winning run as a pinch runner for Andrés Galarraga at first base with a 2–2 score and one out in the ninth, Rivera advanced to second base but reversed course two steps beyond it thinking that the ball hit by Marquis Grissom to deep right-center field was caught by right fielder David Dellucci. Realizing that Dellucci had muffed the ball for an error, he ran past second base, returned to retouch it, headed to third and attempted to score when second baseman Junior Spivey's relay throw bounced off third baseman Alex Cintrón's glove and towards shortstop Tony Womack, who threw out the sliding Rivera at home plate. Rivera's actions were proclaimed by Giants broadcaster Jon Miller as "the worst baserunning in the history of the game." He was released by the Giants on June 3 after batting .180 with two homers and four runs batted in (RBI) in 31 games.

Rivera signed a minor league contract with the Baltimore Orioles one month later on July 3, 2003 and played with the Bowie Baysox.

Mexican League (2007–2019)
He played for the Piratas de Campeche from 2007–2012, switched to Delfines de Ciudad del Carmen in 2013. In 2014, he played center field for the Rieleros de Aguascalientes. In 2015, Rivera played for both the Diablos Rojos del México and the Olmecas de Tabasco. In 2016, he started the season with the Olmecas de Tabasco before he was traded to the Pericos de Puebla, who ended up winning the League Championship. In 2017, he was traded to the Acereros de Monclova. Rivera announced his retirement following the 2019 season with Monclova, winning a championship in his last season as an active player.

World Baseball Classic (2006, 2009)
Rivera played in both the 2006 and 2009 World Baseball Classic for Panama's national team. He is a combined 3 for 16 with 1 home run and 5 strikeouts in both tournaments.

Coaching career
Rivera served as hitting coach for the Olmecas de Tabasco of the Mexican League for the 2021 season.

References

External links
, or Retrosheet, or The Baseball Gauge, or EspnDeportes.com, or Venezuela Winter League

1973 births
Living people
Acereros de Monclova players
Águilas de Mexicali players
Bowie Baysox players
Charlotte Knights players
Cincinnati Reds players
Columbus Clippers players
Diablos Rojos del México players
Delfines de Ciudad del Carmen players
Greensboro Bats players
Gulf Coast Yankees players
Las Vegas Stars (baseball) players
Leones del Caracas players
Panamanian expatriate baseball players in Venezuela
Major League Baseball outfielders
Major League Baseball players from Panama
Mexican League baseball outfielders
New York Yankees players
Norwich Navigators players
Oklahoma RedHawks players
Olmecas de Tabasco players
Oneonta Yankees players
Ottawa Lynx players
Panamanian expatriate baseball players in Canada
Panamanian expatriate baseball players in Mexico
Panamanian expatriate baseball players in the United States
Pericos de Puebla players
People from La Chorrera District
Piratas de Campeche players
Rancho Cucamonga Quakes players
Rieleros de Aguascalientes players
San Diego Padres players
San Francisco Giants players
Tampa Yankees players
Texas Rangers players
Tomateros de Culiacán players
Tulsa Drillers players
Venados de Mazatlán players
2006 World Baseball Classic players
2009 World Baseball Classic players